Kim Pong-ryul (born 1918 - died July 1995) was a North Korean general of the Korean People's Army who served as vice Minister of the People's Armed Forces as well as member of the Workers' Party of Korea, North Korea's ruling communist party. He held the rank of Vice Marshal.

Biography
Kim Pong-ryul participated in the war against Germany as a special armament of the former Soviet artillery during the Korean war, and returned to North Korea at the end of war in 1953. In December 1972 he was appointed Vice-Chief of the Ministry of People's Armed Forces. In December 1986 he became a member of the Central Committee of the party and in March 1995, a member of the Central Military Commission, a member of the National Defence Commission since May 1990. He was also a member of the Supreme People's Assembly for the 3rd, 4th, 5th, 7th, 8th and 9th convocations. On April 20, 1992, he was promoted to the rank of Vice Marshal. He died in July 1995 of 'incurable disease'.

References

Members of the Supreme People's Assembly
Workers' Party of Korea politicians
North Korean generals
Korean independence activists
1918 births
1995 deaths
People of 88th Separate Rifle Brigade